Kenneth Meyer Setton (June 17, 1914 in New Bedford, Massachusetts – February 18, 1995 in Princeton, New Jersey) was an American historian and an expert on the history of medieval Europe, particularly the Crusades.

Early life, education and awards 

Setton's childhood and adolescence were not easy. He supported himself from the age of 13. Setton received his bachelor's degree in 1936 as a Phi Beta Kappa graduate of Boston University. He received his master's degree in 1938 and PhD in 1941 at Columbia University. His dissertation Christian Attitude Toward the Emperor in the Fourth Century was written under the direction of Lynn Thorndike. He also received honorary degrees from Boston University and the University of Kiel. He claimed that knowledge of languages is the basis of knowledge of historical science, and he spoke Italian, French, German and Catalan, besides his favorites, Latin and classical Greek.

Setton spent nearly two decades finishing his classic work, the four-volume The Papacy and the Levant, 1204-1571. For the first two published volumes he received the Haskins Medal of the Medieval Academy of America in 1980. He served as the editor-in-chief of the Wisconsin Collaborative History of the Crusades, published in six volumes from 1969 to 1989.

Setton was elected to the American Philosophical Society in 1952. He received the John Frederick Lewis Prize of the Philosophical Society three times: first in 1957 for his work The Byzantine Background to the Italian Renaissance, then in 1984 for his work The Papacy and the Levant, volume 3 and 4 and in 1990 for his work  Venice, Austria and the Turks in the 17th Century.

Setton was elected to the American Academy of Arts and Sciences in 1960.

Career 
Setton began his teaching career at Boston University and the University of Manitoba. Then he taught at the University of Pennsylvania between 1950 and 1965, succeeding another medievalist, . In the period between 1965 and 1968 he taught at the University of Wisconsin, where he was appointed director of the Institute for Research in the Humanities. After 1968 he worked at the Institute for Advanced Study in Princeton, New Jersey.

He had many concurrent appointments, such as director of the library at the University of Pennsylvania, acting director of the Gennadius Library in Greece and Guggenheim Fellow.

Selected works 

 
 
 
 A History of the Crusades (1969–1989). Six volumes. University of Wisconsin Press, 1955–1989, as editor in chief with Harry W. Hazard, Robert Lee Wolff, Marshall W. Baldwin and Norman P. Zacour as co-editors. This series is known as the Wisconsin Collaborative History of the Crusades.
 
 
  A history of the founding of the Catalan Company and their subsequent control of the Duchy of Athens and Thebes.
The Age of Chivalry (1969).

References

External links 
 Almanac of University of Pennsylvania containing information about appointment of Kenneth Setton as professor of Medieval History
 Almanac of University of Pennsylvania containing information about Setton being awarded with John Frederick Lewis Prize in 1957
 Short biography on Historians web site
 Short biography at Jstor website
 Obituary of Kenneth M. Setton published in New York Times
The Alfred E. Hamill Letters to Kenneth Meyer Setton at Newberry Library
A History of the Crusades, University of Wisconsin Press, 1969–1989.
 

1914 births
1995 deaths
American medievalists
Historians of the Crusades
Slavists
Institute for Advanced Study faculty
20th-century American historians
American male non-fiction writers
People from New Bedford, Massachusetts
Boston University faculty
University of Pennsylvania faculty
Members of the Institute for Catalan Studies
Fellows of the Medieval Academy of America
Historians from Massachusetts
20th-century American male writers
Members of the American Philosophical Society